Donna-Lee Patrick (born 5 April 1982) is a former field hockey player from Australia, who played as a forward.

Personal life
Donna-Lee Patrick was born and raised in Alice Springs, Northern Territory.

Career

AHL
Patrick made her debut in the Australian Hockey League (AHL) in 2000 as a member of the Territory Pearls. Following a move to Adelaide, Patrick transferred to the Adelaide Suns, where she represented South Australia for six seasons.

International hockey

Under–21
In 2001, Patrick was a member of the Australia U–21 side, the Jillaroos. She represented the team at the FIH Junior World Cup in Buenos Aires, where she won a bronze medal.

Hockeyroos
Patrick also made her senior international debut in 2001, representing Australia's national team, the Hockeyroos, at the Korean Telecom Cup in Seoul.

Throughout her career, Patrick represented the Hockeyroos on 80 occasions, most notably at the 2006 FIH World Cup in Madrid, where she won a silver medal. She also won gold at three consecutive Oceania Cup's, from 2001 through 2005.

International goals

References

External links

1982 births
Living people
Australian female field hockey players
Female field hockey forwards
Sportswomen from the Northern Territory